Ying Zou is a Canadian computer scientist. She is a professor in the Department of Electrical and Computer Engineering at Queen's University and a Canada Research Chair (Tier I) in Software Evolution. She was awarded the IBM CAS Research Faculty Fellow of the Year in 2014 and the IBM Faculty Award in 2007 and 2008.

Education 
Zou has a Bachelor of Engineering (B.Eng) degree from Beijing Polytechnic University, a Masters of Engineering (M.Eng) degree from the Chinese Academy of Space Technology, and a Ph.D. in Electrical and Computer Engineering from the University of Waterloo.

Career 
Zou is a professor and the lead of the Software Evolution and Analytic Lab (SEAL) at Queen's University. Her research interest includes Software Engineering, Software Evolution, Software Analytics, Software Empirical Studies and Service Oriented Architecture (SOA).

References

Living people
Academic staff of Queen's University at Kingston
Canadian computer scientists
University of Waterloo alumni
Canadian people of Chinese descent
Year of birth missing (living people)